Llanbethery Platform was a short-lived railway station in the Vale of Glamorgan, South Wales.

History
The station was one of four platforms opened on the line on 1 May 1905. They were designed to cater for the new service run by the Taff Vale Railway using steam railmotors. Llanbethery Platform was of a similar design to the others, consisting of a single forty-foot platform without a shelter. Passengers were confined to a fenced enclosure at the rear of the platform which was unlocked by the train guard. Like many other stations on the line, Llanbethery Platform was not situated near the village, and passengers had to descend a steep hill to reach the station.

Closure
The line between Cowbridge and Aberthaw rarely paid its way. Llanbethery Platform was closed, along with the other 'platforms' at Aberthin and St Hilary, on 12 July 1920.

Notes

References
 
 

Railway stations in Great Britain opened in 1905
Railway stations in Great Britain closed in 1920
Disused railway stations in the Vale of Glamorgan
Former Taff Vale Railway stations